was a maritime college in Imizu, Toyama, Japan, established in 1906.
The college merged with Toyama National College of Technology in 2009.

Toyama college maritime programs
The programs are of about 5 to 5.5 years (maritime) including practical training in the sea. The college conducts following maritime programs:
Nautical Science Program for Deck Officers and Captains
Marine Engineering Program for Engineering Officers
International Trade and Transport Program

See also
List of maritime colleges

References

External links
Toyama college website

Educational institutions established in 1906
Universities and colleges in Toyama Prefecture
1906 establishments in Japan
Maritime colleges in Japan